The 2015 IIFA Awards, officially known as the 16th International Indian Film Academy Awards ceremony, presented by the International Indian Film Academy honouring the best Hindi films of 2014, took place on 5 June 2015. The official ceremony took place on 7 June 2015 in Ritz Carlton Kuala Lumpur, Malaysia.  The ceremony was televised in India and internationally on Colors for the first time. The ceremony was co–hosted by actors Arjun Kapoor and Ranveer Singh, for the first time as hosts. This show was telecasted on colors on Sunday 5 July 2015, 8pm.

IIFA Rocks, otherwise known as the IIFA Music and Fashion Extravaganza took place on 5 June 2015.

Haider led the ceremony with 14 nominations, followed by 2 States with 10 nominations, and PK and Queen with 7 nominations each.

Haider won 9 awards, including Best Actor (for Shahid Kapoor), Best Supporting Actress (for Tabu) and Best Villain (Kay Kay Menon), thus becoming the most–awarded film at the ceremony.

Winners and nominees

Popular awards

Special awards

Musical awards

Technical awards

Most nominations

14; Haider
10; 2 States
7; PK and Queen
6; Ek Villain and Kick
4; Highway
2; Happy New Year, Mary Kom, CityLights, Heropanti and Bang Bang

Most wins
9; Haider
5; Queen
4; Ek Villain
3; Kick
2; PK

See also

International Indian Film Academy Awards
Bollywood
Cinema of India

External links

References

2. www.iifaawards2015live.com

IIfa Awards
IIFA awards